Camille A. Brown is a dancer, choreographer, director and dance educator. She is the Founder & Artistic Director of Camille A. Brown & Dancers, and has congruently choreographed commissioned pieces for dance companies, Broadway shows, and universities. Brown started her career as a dancer in Ronald K. Brown’s Evidence, A Dance Company, and was a guest artist with Rennie Harris Puremovement, and Alvin Ailey American Dance Theater (2008 and 2011). Brown has choreographed major Broadway shows such as Choir Boy, Once on This Island and Jesus Christ Superstar Live in Concert! that aired on NBC. Brown also teaches dance and gives lectures to audiences at various universities such as Long Island University, Barnard College and ACDFA (University of Akron), among others.

Camille A. Brown & Dancers partnered with Google Arts & Culture on a project for Black History Month exploring the story of Black history and culture through dance where "ink" was highlighted and filmed at Brooklyn Historical Society.

Brown has received awards and accolades including being a five-time Princess Grace Award recipient, Tony Award Nominee for best Choreography for Choir Boy, TED Fellow, Guggenheim Fellowship, Doris Duke Performing Artist Award, Obie Award, Dance Magazine Award Honoree, USA Jay Franke & David Herro Fellow, and a Bessie Award. She has been featured on the cover of Dance Magazine (April 2018) and Dance Teacher Magazine (August 2015).

Brown has performed at the 2018 and 2015 TED Conference in Vancouver, Canada and given talks at both TEDxBeaconStreet and TEDx Estée Lauder Companies.

Camille A. Brown is the Choreographer for Roundabout Theater’s Toni Stone, Much Ado About Nothing- directed by Kenny Leon, Once The Musical, and will make her Metropolitan Opera debut as Choreographer for Porgy & Bess. Brown made her directorial debut with the Broadway revival of for colored girls who have considered suicide/ when the rainbow is enuf, and Fire Shut Up In My Bones for The Metropolitan Opera (co-directed with James Robinson).

Ms. Brown made her Broadway Directorial Debut for the Broadway revival of for colored girls who have considered suicide/when the rainbow is enuf making her the first Black woman to Direct and Choreograph a Broadway show in 67 years. The production received 7 Tony Award nominations including Best Direction of a Play and Best Choreography, 3 Outer Critics Circle Award nominations including Outstanding Director of a Play and Outstanding Choreography, 3 Drama League Award nominations including Outstanding Direction of a Play, 3 Chita Rivera Award nominations including Outstanding Choreography in a Broadway Show, and 2 Drama Desk Award nominations and The New York Times proclaimed the production "Triumphant" and "a Broadway homecoming celebration that you will not want to miss."

Dance training 
As a child, Brown trained at The Bernice Johnson Dance Center and The Carolyn DeVore Dance Center. She continued her training in high school at Fiorello H. LaGuardia High School of Music & Art and the Performing Arts while simultaneously attending The Ailey School on scholarship. Brown earned a B.F.A. from the University of North Carolina School of the Arts and went on to dance as a member of Ronald K. Brown’s Evidence, A Dance Company, and was a guest artist with Rennie Harris Puremovement and Alvin Ailey American Dance Theater.

Camille A. Brown & Dancers 
Brown's company, Camille A. Brown & Dancers, debuted in 2006. Reviewing their debut, The New York Times said Brown's "personal physical style, with its focused bursts of energy and frozen positions that explode into motion, colors her group works very differently."

Camille A. Brown & Dancers has performed works such as ink, Bessie Award winning Mr. TOL E. RAncE, Bessie Award nominated BLACK GIRL: Linguistic Play, City of Rain, Good & Grown, and The Groove to Nobody’s Business, among others. The company has performed these works in national and international venues, including The Kennedy Center, NYU Abu Dhabi, The Joyce Theater, New York City Center's Fall for Dance Festival, Lincoln Center for the Performing Arts, Jacob’s Pillow Dance Festival, Bates Dance Festival, The Yard, White Bird, REDCAT, and Belfast Festival at Queen's, among others.

Choreography 
Informed by her music background as a clarinetist, Brown creates choreography that utilizes musical composition as storytelling. Brown has choreographed for various commercial and theater projects including  Choir Boy, Once On This Island,  Jesus Christ Superstar Live in Concert!, NIKE/Air Jordan, BELLA: An American Tall Tale (Director: Kirsten Childs), Cabin in the Sky (musical) (Director: Ruben Santiago-Hudson), and Broadway's A Streetcar Named Desire. Dance companies that have commissioned her work include: Alvin Ailey American Dance Theater, Philadanco, Urban Bush Women, Complexions, Ailey II, and Ballet Memphis. Her works have been performed at The Kennedy Center, Apollo Theatre, Brooklyn Academy of Music, Madison Square Garden, and New York City Center. She also was the choreographer for Saverio Palatella's line, Wholegarment 3D, for New York Fashion Week in 2008.

In 2019, she was nominated for a TONY for Best Choreography.

Community engagement 
In 2014, Brown founded two initiatives: The Gathering, an annual open forum for intergenerational Black female artists to advocate for greater cultural equity and acknowledgement in the dance world; and BLACK GIRL SPECTRUM (BGS), a community engagement initiative.

On June 4, 2016, BGS had its inaugural symposium with the theme “Social Dance for Social Change” at Dr. Barbara Ann Teer’s National Black Theatre in Harlem, NY.

In 2018, Brown created a community engagement platform, Every Body Move (EBM), to serve as the umbrella for all initiatives that bring the artistic rigor of Camille A. Brown & Dancers’ beyond the stage and into communities. Every Body Move works to cultivate the creative capacity of its participants through workshops, summer intensives, artistic encounters, educational experiences, public actions, and celebrations for people of diverse abilities, identities, and ages. The initiative includes: Black Girl Spectrum (BGS); Black Men Moving (BMM); The Gathering; Creative Action Lab; Every Body Move Celebration.

Choreographed works 
2002      Awakened in Slumber (Hubbard Street 2)
2004      Demetia’s Serenity (Camille A. Brown)
2005      More Time Than Anybody (Camille A. Brown & Dancers)
2005      Shelter of Presence (Camille A. Brown)
2005      Nahum (Ailey II)
2006      Afro Blue (Reflections Dance Company)	
2006      New Second Line (Reflections Dance Company)		
2006      More Time Than Anybody (Camille A. Brown & Dancers)
2007      The Evolution of a Secured Feminine (Alvin Ailey American Dance Theater)
2007      Here We Go…Again?! (Urban Bush Women)
2007      The Groove To Nobody’s Business (Alvin Ailey American Dance Theater)
2008      Saverio Palatella’s line – Wholegarment 3D (New York Fashion Week)
2008      Un Festin Divin (Ballet Memphis)				
2008      Matchstick (Camille A. Brown & Dancers)
2009      The Groove To Nobody’s Business (Alvin Ailey American Dance Theater)
2009      The Blues On Beale (Ballet Memphis)
2009      Good Times, Ha! (The Youth American Grand Prix)
2009      Those Who See Light (Philadelphia Dance Company – Philadanco!)
2010       Our Honeymoon Is Over (Dallas Black Dance Theater)			
2010       Been There, Done That (Camille A. Brown & Dancers)
2010       City of Rain (Camille A. Brown & Dancers)
2010       By Way of East (Kyle Abraham & Camille A. Brown)
2010       The Evolution of a Secured Feminine (Alvin Ailey American Dance Theater)
2012       Strum (Toni Pierce Sands and Uri Sands Dance (TU Dance))
2012       One Second Past the Future (Camille A. Brown & Dancers)
2012       Memories (Complexions Contemporary Ballet)
2012       Bind (The Juilliard School)
2012       Pins & Needles: FUREE (Director Ken Rus Schmoll)
2012       HOUSE (Director Saheem Ali)
2012       Fortress of Solitude (Director Daniel Aukin)
2012      A Streetcar Named Desire (Director Emily Mann)
2013       William Shakespeare’s The Winter’s Tale (Director Rebecca Taichman)
2013       MR. TOL. E RAncE (Camille A. Brown & Dancers)
2014       The Box: A Black Comedy (Director: Seth Bockley)
2014       tick, tick...BOOM! (Director: Oliver Butler)
2014       GALOIS (Director: Victor Maog)
2014       The Fortress of Solitude (The Public Theater)
2015       Blood Quilt (Director: Kamilah Forbes)
2015       Stagger Lee (Director: Patricia McGregor)
2015       Cabin in the Sky (musical) (Director: Ruben Santiago-Hudson)
2015       BLACK GIRL: Linguistic Play (Camille A. Brown & Dancers)
2016       BELLA: An American Tall Tale (Director: Robert O'Hara)
2016       NIKE/Air Jordan Web Commercial with Russell Westbrook
2017       ink (Camille A. Brown & Dancers)
2017       Once On This Island Revival
2018       Jesus Christ Superstar Live in Concert! on NBC
2019       Choir Boy, Broadway
2019       Toni Stone (Roundabout Theatre, Director: Pam MacKinnon)
2019       Much Ado About Nothing (Shakespeare in the Park, Director: Kenny Leon)
2019       Once (Pittsburgh Civic Light Opera, Director:  J. Michael Zygo)
2019       Porgy & Bess (The Metropolitan Opera, Director: James Robinson)
2019       for colored girls who have considered suicide/when the rainbow is enuf ( The Public Theater, Director: Leah C. Gardiner)
2020       Ma Rainey’s Black Bottom (Netflix)
2021       Angry, Raucous and Shamelessly Gorgeous (Spotlight On Plays)
2021       Fire Shut Up in My Bones (The Metropolitan Opera)
2021       Toni Stone (Arena Stage)
2022       Harlem (Amazon Prime Video)
2022       for colored girls who have considered suicide/when the rainbow is enuf (Broadway, The Booth Theatre)

Honors 
1997 - The Helen Tamiris Award – Performance
1997 - Young Artist’s Award – Performance
1997 - Presidential Scholar of the Arts Award – Dance Performance; Young Artist’s Award – Performance; The Helen Tamiris Award – Performance
2006 - Project Next Generation Award – Urban Bush Women
2006 - Princess Grace Award – Choreography; Project Next Generation Award – Urban Bush Women
2006 - Best Choreography Nomination – Black Theater Arts Alliance – The Groove To Nobody’s Business – Alvin Ailey American Dance Theater, USA Artist Award Nomination
2011 - Bessie Awards Nomination – Outstanding Performance (The Evolution of A Secured Feminine)
2012 - The New York City College Women and Culture Award
2012 - Mariam McGlone Emerging Choreographer Award (Wesleyan University); The New York City College Women and Culture Award; USA Artist Award Nomination
2013 - The Founder’s Award – International Association of Blacks in Dance (IABD)
2013 - Princess Grace Works in Progress Residency 
2014 - Bessie Awards – Outstanding Performance – MR. TOL. E RAncE
2015 - Lucille Lortel Awards Nomination - Outstanding Choreographer (Fortress of Solitude)
2015 - USA Jay Franke & David Herro Fellow
2015 - Doris Duke Performing Artist Award
2015 - TED Fellow
2016 - Bessie Awards Nomination - Outstanding Performance - BLACK GIRL: Linguistic Play
2016 - Princess Grace Choreographic Mentorship Co-Commission Award
2016 - Jacob's Pillow Dance Award
2016 - Guggenheim Fellowship
2016 - Princess Grace Foundation-USA Statue Award
2017 - Ford Foundation Art of Change Fellow
2017 - Irma P. Hall Black Theater Nomination (BELLA: An American Tall Tale)
2017 - Audelco Award - Best Choreography (BELLA: An American Tall Tale)
2017 - Black Woman Scholar Warrior Award (Montclair State University)
2018 - Cover Girl of Dance Magazine (April)
2018 - Lucille Lortel Awards Nomination - Outstanding Choreographer (BELLA: An American Tall Tale)
2018 - Outer Critics Circle Award Nomination - Outstanding Choreographer (Once On This Island)
2018 - Drama Desk LaDuca Award Nomination - Outstanding Choreographer (Once On This Island)
2018 - Chita Rivera Awards for Dance and Choreography Nomination - Outstanding Choreographer (Once On This Island)
2019 - Drama Desk Award Nominee for Outstanding Choreography for Choir Boy
2019 - Tony Award Nominee for Best Choreography for Choir Boy
2019 - Choreography Mentorship Co-Commission (CMCC) Award (Princess Grace Award)
2019 - Audelco Award Nominee for Choreography (Much Ado About Nothing) 
2019 - Audelco Award Nominee for Choreography (Toni Stone)
2019 - Audelco Award Winner for Choreography (Much Ado About Nothing)
2019 - SDCF Callaway Award Finalist (Much Ado About Nothing)
2020 - Lucille Lortel Award Nominee for Outstanding Choreographer (Toni Stone)
2020 - Lucille Lortel Award Nominee for Outstanding Choreographer (for colored girls who have considered suicide/when the rainbow is enuf)
2020 - Drama Desk Award Nominee for Outstanding Choreography (for colored girls who have considered suicide/when the rainbow is enuf)
2020 - Antonyo Award Nominee for Best Choreography (for colored girls who have considered suicide/when the rainbow is enuf)
2020 - Antonyo Award Nominee for Best Quarantine Content (Social Dance for Social Distance)
2020 - Antonyo Award Winner for Best Choreography (for colored girls who have considered suicide/when the rainbow is enuf)
2020 - Obie Award Winner for Sustained Excellence in Choreography
2020 - Dance Magazine Award Honoree
2020 - Emerson Collective Fellow 
2021 - ISPA Distinguished Artist Award
2022- Kennedy Center Next 50
2022- Chita Rivera Award Nominee for Outstanding Choreography in a Broadway Show (for colored girls who have considered suicide/when the rainbow is enuf)
2022- Drama League Award Nominee for Outstanding Direction of a Play (for colored girls who have considered suicide/when the rainbow is enuf)
2022- Outer Critics Circle Award Nominee for Outstanding Choreography (for colored girls who have considered suicide/when the rainbow is enuf)
2022- Outer Critics Circle Award Nominee for Outstanding Director of a Play (for colored girls who have considered suicide/when the rainbow is enuf)
2022- Tony Award Nominee for Best Choreography (for colored girls who have considered suicide/when the rainbow is enuf)
2022- Tony Award Nominee for Best Direction of a Play (for colored girls who have considered suicide/when the rainbow is enuf)
2022- Antonyo Award Nominee for Best Direction (Broadway) (for colored girls who have considered suicide/when the rainbow is enuf)
2022- Bessie Award Nominee for Outstanding Choreographer/Creator (Fire Shut Up in My Bones)
2023- The Award (Formerly Known as the "Antonyo Award") for Best Direction of a Play on Broadway (for colored girls who have considered suicide/when the rainbow is enuf)

References

External links 
Archival footage of Camille A. Brown performing her work The Evolution of a Secured Feminine at Jacob's Pillow in 2010
Archival footage of Camille A. Brown and Kyle Abraham performing in their work How We Process Jacob's Pillow in 2011
Archival footage of Camille A. Brown & Dancers performing BLACK GIRL: Linguistic Play in 2017 at Jacob's Pillow
Camille A. Brown on the American Theatre Wing's documentary series "Working in the Theatre" on choreography in 2016.

Living people
1979 births
University of North Carolina School of the Arts alumni
American female dancers
American dancers
Modern dancers
American choreographers
African-American female dancers
African-American dancers
African-American choreographers
Princess Grace Awards winners
Barnard College faculty
Bessie Award winners
Fiorello H. LaGuardia High School alumni